Vitalina Olegovna Simonova (born 18 September 1992) is a Russian breaststroke swimmer. She finished third in the individual 200 m at the 2013 European Short Course Swimming Championships, but later received a silver medal after the winner, Yuliya Yefimova, failed a doping test. She was also part of the Russian mixed medley relay team that won a bronze medal at the 2014 European Aquatics Championships.

Simonova also competes in the freestyle with fins, and won two world titles in 2012, in the 50 m and 100 m events.

References

1992 births
Living people
Russian female breaststroke swimmers
Russian female swimmers
European Aquatics Championships medalists in swimming
Finswimmers
People from Orsk
Sportspeople from Orenburg Oblast
20th-century Russian women
21st-century Russian women